Timis Bardis (born 1 July 1997) is a Greek professional footballer who plays as a midfielder for Greek club Ialysos.

References

External links

1997 births
Living people
People from Gjirokastër County
Footballers from Gjirokastër
Albanian footballers
Association football midfielders
Greek footballers
Greek expatriates in Albania
Diagoras F.C. players
GAS Ialysos 1948 F.C. players
Maccabi Ahi Nazareth F.C. players
KS Egnatia Rrogozhinë players
Kategoria Superiore players
Greek expatriate footballers
Expatriate footballers in Israel
Greek expatriate sportspeople in Israel